Tân Thành (Vietnamese: Xã Tân Thành) is a commune of Lai Vung District, Đồng Tháp Province, in the Mekong Delta region of Vietnam. The commune has an area of 17,9 km², the population of 2009 is 15.748 people, with the density of 884,1 people/km². In 2013 there are 23.109 people, with a population density of 1.291 people/km²

Geographical location
Tân Thành borders Tân Phước Commune to the north and Long Hậu commune to the east. The Hậu River is to the west, and Vĩnh Thới commune is to the south.

Tân Thành goes to other cities: 17.8 km W of Sa Dec, 22.5 km SE of Long Xuyen, 32.6 km NW of Can Tho, 41.1 km W of Vinh Long

Divisions
Ấp Tân An
Ấp Tân Bình
Ấp Tân Định
Ấp Tân Lợi
Ấp Tân Lộc
Ấp Tân Khánh
Ấp Tân Hưng

Economy
Tân Thành has two large Industrial Zones:
 Sông Hậu Industrial Zone.
 Cái Đôi Industrial Complex 100ha

Education

References 

Communes of Dong Thap province
Populated places in Đồng Tháp province